These are some of the articles related to Rwanda on the English Wikipedia pages:

0-9

A
Aegis Trust
Agathe Habyarimana
Akazu
Arusha Accords
Assassination of Habyarimana and Ntaryamira
Archaeology of Rwanda

B

Banyamulenge
Banyarwanda
Belgian colonial empire
Brent Beardsley
Burundi
Burundi genocide

C
Clinton Hunter Development Initiative

D

Democratic Republic of the Congo
Dominique Mbonyumutwa

E
East Africa
East African Community
East African Federation
Eastern Province, Rwanda
Emmanuel Habyarimana
Energy in Rwanda

F

First Congo War
Fred Rwigema

G

Gacaca
Gahini
Gatuna
Georges Rutaganda
German East Africa
Gisenyi
Gitarama
Gitarama Province
Great Lakes refugee crisis
Grégoire Kayibanda
Gustav Adolf von Götzen

H

Hamitic hypothesis
History of Rwanda
Hôtel des Mille Collines
Hotel Rwanda
Hutu
Hutu Power

I

Interahamwe
International Criminal Tribunal for Rwanda

J
Juvénal Habyarimana

K

Kangura
Kigali
Kigali Institute of Science and Technology
Kigali International Airport
Kigali Province, Rwanda
Kigali Rural
Kigeri V of Rwanda
Kingdom of Rwanda
Kinyarwanda

L
Lake Kivu
Lake Muhazi
Laurent Kabila
LGBT rights in Rwanda (Gay rights)
List of kings of Rwanda
List of presidents of Rwanda
Louis Rwagasore

M

Mai-Mai
Maraba coffee
Mobutu Sese Seko
Jeanne d'Arc Mujawamariya
Mutara, Rwanda
Mutara III of Rwanda
Mwami

N

National Republican Movement for Democracy and Development
Nile River
Northern Province, Rwanda
Nyagatare
Nyungwe Forest

O

Opération Turquoise
Origins of Tutsi and Hutu
Our Lady of Kibeho

P

Parmehutu
Partnership for Enhancing Agriculture in Rwanda through Linkages
Pasteur Bizimungu
Paul Kagame
Paul Rusesabagina
President of Rwanda
Pretoria Accord
Pygmy

Q

R

Rassemblement Démocratique pour le Rwanda
Roméo Dallaire
Ruanda-Urundi
Rusumo Falls
Rwanda
Rwandan Civil War
Rwandan genocide
Rwanda Patriotic Front

S
Shake Hands with the Devil (book)
Shake Hands with the Devil: The Journey of Roméo Dallaire (film)
Southern Province, Rwanda

T

Tanzania
Théodore Sindikubwabo
Théoneste Bagosora
Tutsi
Twa

U
Uganda
United Nations Assistance Mission for Rwanda

V
Virunga Mountains
Volcanoes National Park

W

Water supply and sanitation in Rwanda
Western Province, Rwanda
We Wish to Inform You That Tomorrow We Will Be Killed with Our Families

X

Y
Youth in Rwanda
Yuhi IV of Rwanda

Z

Rwanda
 Index